The 2019 Magic Darts CDC Tour consisted of 10 darts tournaments on the 2019 PDC Pro Tour.

The Professional Darts Corporation announced in February 2019 that it would be investing in the Championship Darts Circuit (CDC) for funding the events in North America.

Prize money
Each event had a prize fund of $8,800.

This is how the prize money is divided:

March

CDC Tour 1 
CDC Tour 1 was contested on Saturday 30 March 2019 at the Columbia Social Club, Philadelphia, United States.

CDC Tour 2 
CDC Tour 2 was contested on Sunday 31 March 2019 at the Columbia Social Club, Philadelphia, United States.

May

CDC Tour 3 
CDC Tour 3 was contested on Saturday 4 May 2019 at the Royal Canadian Legion Branch 551, Waterdown, Canada.

CDC Tour 4 
CDC Tour 4 was contested on Sunday 5 May 2019 at the Royal Canadian Legion Branch 551, Waterdown, Canada.

June

CDC Tour 5 
CDC Tour 5 was contested on Saturday 1 June 2019 at the Holiday Inn North Shore, Skokie, United States.

CDC Tour 6 
CDC Tour 6 was contested on Sunday 2 June 2019 at the Holiday Inn North Shore, Skokie, United States.

August

CDC Tour 7 
CDC Tour 7 was contested on Saturday 10 August 2019 at the Ramada Plaza Hotel North Shore, Wheeling, United States.

CDC Tour 8 
CDC Tour 8 was contested on Sunday 11 August 2019 at the Ramada Plaza Hotel North Shore, Wheeling, United States.

September

CDC Tour 9 
CDC Tour 9 was contested on Saturday 14 September 2019 at the Columbia Social Club, Philadelphia, United States.

CDC Tour 10 
CDC Tour 10 was contested on Sunday 15 September 2019 at the Columbia Social Club, Philadelphia, United States.

References

2019 in darts
2019 PDC Pro Tour